Boca de Cupé is a corregimiento in Pinogana District, Darién Province, Panama with a population of 1,167 as of 2010. Its population as of 1990 was 901; its population as of 2000 was 902.

The town is not served by any paved roads, with the Pan-American Highway to the north ending at Yaviza.  It is reachable by boat up the Tuira River.  Civilians are not permitted to travel farther east towards Colombia.Moon Central America (2016) ("Travel up the Rio Tuira beyond Boca de Cupe is considered dangerous and has been off-limits for several years.  Boca de Cupe itself has a border-police post, but that doesn't necessarily make it safe.")Darien Travel Guide, Rough Guides, Retrieved 29 November 2022

In the early 1900s, a single-gage railway ran to the town from the Cana gold mines.Karsten, Matthew (17 September 2019). The Day I Was Kicked Out of a Panamanian Village, Expert Vagabond  It ceased operating in 1911.(25 December 1926). Gold Areas of the Province of Panama, in Engineering and Mining Journal, p. 1027

Villages within the corregimiento farther up the river include Sobiaquirú.

References

Corregimientos of Darién Province
Road-inaccessible communities of Panama